Kerri Woelke (born August 15, 1977) is a Folk/Roots/Alt-Country singer-songwriter from Winnipeg, Manitoba, Canada. She is currently represented by Signpost Music.

Biography
Manitoba born, the child of fun-loving 60's musician mother and a poetic (but tone deaf) father, Kerri showed her artistic promise early. Her parents gave her a karaoke machine during her elementary school years, and by the time she emerged from her room for her high school graduation, she was ready to begin sharing her music with the public. At her parents' insistence ("You need to learn to back yourself up!"), and to her roommate's distress, Kerri taught herself to play guitar while attending college. Relegated to the tiny dorm bathroom to practice, she emerged from this experience determined to offer her growing repertoire of originals with a wider audience. The next years were spent honing her craft with the bands Dirty Old Hank and Gretchen, playing at Manitoba festivals and on the CBC. In 2005, Kerri switched to a solo singer–songwriter format, won the Manitoba Christian Talent Search, and recorded her first solo album (self-titled – released February 2007). That project received 2 Covenant Award nominations, Folk/Roots Album of the Year, and CD Design of the Year (designed by Cyndi Koshowski) as well as a Western Canadian Music Award (WCMA) for Outstanding Christian Recording. Kerri is presently an Artist in Development with Canadian indie label Signpost Music. She continues touring across Canada, and has completed her second album Where We Were which was released in September 2008.

Discography

Awards and recognition

Gospel Music Association of Canada Covenant Awards
 2007 nominee, Folk/Roots Album of the Year: Kerri Woelke
 2007 nominee, CD/DVD Artwork Design of the Year: Kerri Woelke (designed by Cyndi Koshowski)

Western Canadian Music Awards
 2007 nominee, Outstanding Christian Recording: Kerri Woelke

See also
 Music of Manitoba

References

External links
 Kerri Woelke official site
 Kerri Woelke's Facebook
 Kerri Woelke's MySpace
 Kerri Woelke last.fm
 Signpost Music (label)
  

1977 births
Canadian performers of Christian music
Canadian women singer-songwriters
Canadian singer-songwriters
Living people
Musicians from Winnipeg
21st-century Canadian women singers